Joaquín Luis Miguel Suárez de Rondelo (August 18, 1781 in Canelones – December 26, 1868 in Montevideo) was a Uruguayan political figure.

Head of State of Uruguay

In December 1828, Suárez served as the first head of state of the territory that was about to be known as Uruguay two years later.

President of Uruguay
He served as the President of the Senate of Uruguay from 1841 to 1845. Suárez served in the office designated as President of Uruguay from 1843 to 1852, during the Uruguayan Civil War. However, his effective rule was limited to the old city of Montevideo; historians remember this rule as "Gobierno de la Defensa" (Defense Government), as he was defending the city during the Great Siege of Montevideo, which in turn was led by Manuel Oribe, who ruled over the rest of the country.

He was the country's longest ruling president.

Designer of Uruguayan flag
He is credited with designing the Uruguayan flag.

Legacy
The town of Joaquín Suárez is named after him.

See also
 History of Uruguay

References

External links
 Escuela Digital / Biography of J. Suarez
 Harvard Library / Biography of J. Suarez
 Open Library / Biography of J. Suarez (book reference)

1781 births
1868 deaths
People from Canelones, Uruguay
Presidents of Uruguay
Presidents of the Senate of Uruguay
Colorado Party (Uruguay) politicians
Foreign ministers of Uruguay
Uruguayan people of Spanish descent
National symbols of Uruguay
Flag designers
Place of birth missing
Burials at Montevideo Metropolitan Cathedral